Khomsianeh-ye Musaabad (also Romanized as Khomsīāneh-ye Mūsáābād) is a village in Beyranvand-e Jonubi Rural District, Bayravand District, Khorramabad County, Lorestan Province, Iran. At the 2006 census, its population was 19, in 4 families.

References 

Towns and villages in Khorramabad County